Paris School District 7  is a school district in Paris, Arkansas, United States.

The district encompasses  of land in Logan County, and serves Paris, New Blaine, and a section of Subiaco.

In 1968 the Logan County school district merged into the Paris district.

Schools 
 Paris High School, serving grades 9 through 12.
 Paris Middle School, serving grades 5 through 8.
 Paris Elementary School, serving prekindergarten through grade 4.

References

Further reading
 (Download)

External links
 

Education in Logan County, Arkansas
School districts in Arkansas
Paris, Arkansas